Ford engines are those used in Ford Motor Company vehicles and in aftermarket, sports and kit applications. Different engine ranges are used in various global markets.

3 cylinder
A series of Ford DOHC 12-valve inline-three engines with Twin Independent Variable Camshaft Timing (Ti-VCT), labelled as Fox (1.0 L), Duratec (1.1 L), Dragon (1.2 L and 1.5 L) and turbocharged 1.0 L and 1.5 L as EcoBoost.

1.0 L Fox
 2012–present 1.0 L Fox Ti-VCT I3, naturally aspirated.
The smallest Ford 3-cylinder engine.
Displacement: 998 cc
Bore x stroke: 71.9 mm x 82.0 mm
Compression ratio: 12.0:1
Maximum power:  @ 6300–6500 rpm
Maximum torque:  @ 4100–4500 rpm
Applications:
 2013–2017 Ford Fiesta
 2016–present Ford Ka

 2012–present 1.0 L EcoBoost I3
The turbocharged version of 1.0 L Fox engine.

1.1 L Duratec
 2017–present 1.1 L Duratec Ti-VCT I3, naturally-aspirated.
 Displacement: 1084 cc
 Bore x stroke: 73.0 mm x 86.3 mm
 Compression ratio: 12.0:1
Maximum power:  @5000–6500 rpm
 Maximum torque:  @3500 rpm
Application:
 2017–present Ford Fiesta

1.2 L Dragon
 2017–present 1.2 L Dragon Ti-VCT I3, naturally aspirated.
Based from 1.5 L Dragon engine but with smaller piston and without balancer shaft.
Displacement: 1194 cc
Bore x stroke: 75.0 mm x 90.0 mm
Compression ratio: 11.2:1
Maximum power:  PS @ 6500 rpm
Maximum torque:  @ 4250 rpm
Applications:
2017–present Ford Figo/Aspire/Freestyle

1.5 L Dragon
 2017–present 1.5 L Dragon Ti-VCT I3, naturally aspirated.
Displacement: 1497 cc
Bore x stroke: 84.0 mm x 90.0 mm
Compression ratio: 11.0:1
Maximum power:
 @ 6500 rpm
 @ 5500 rpm (ethanol)
Maximum torque:
 @ 4250–4750 rpm
 @ 4750 rpm (ethanol)
Applications:
2017–present Ford EcoSport
2018–present Ford Focus
2018–present Ford Ka

 2018–present 1.5 L EcoBoost I3
The turbocharged version of 1.5 L Dragon engine.

4 cylinder
 1904–1906 Ford Model B (1904) engine
 1906–1908 Ford Model N/R/S engine
 1908–1927 Ford Model T engine
 1928–1931 Ford Model A engine (also see Ford Model A (1927-1931))
 1932–1934 Ford Model B engine (see Ford Model B (1932))
 1932–1962 Ford Sidevalve
 1951–1966 Consul 4—(United Kingdom)
 1961–1977 Essex V4—(United Kingdom: Used in Transit Mk.1, Granada Mk.1/Consul, Capri Mk.1) (South Africa: Used in Ford Corsair, Ford Capri Mk. 1, Ford Cortina Mk III)
 1962–1981 Taunus V4 (or Cologne V4)—(Germany) Used in Ford Taunus V4, Saab Saab 95, Saab Sonett and Saab 96 until 1980.
 1968–1983 Renault Cléon engine—Ford Corcel from Willys/Renault Dauphine (Brazil)
 1959–2002 Kent—(UK) 1.0-1.6 L I4 (Europe)
 1959–1968 Kent (Original) 1.0–1.5L (used in Anglia, Consul Capri, Cortina Mk.1)
 1962–1975 Lotus Twin Cam 1.6 L (used in Lotus Elan, Cortina, Europa, Ford Escort, and Caterham Super Seven)
 1967–1980 Crossflow 1.1 L, 1.3 L, 1.6 L (used in Cortina Mk.2, Capri Mk.1, Escort Mk.1 & Mk.2, Ford Fiesta Mk.1 (1.6 versions), Reliant Anadol (1.3 and 1.6 versions)
 1969–198? BDA 1.6 L (used in Escort RS1600, and Caterham Super Seven)
 1976–1989 Valencia 1.0 L, 1.1 L, 1.3 L (used in Fiesta Mk.1 & Mk.2, Escort Mk.3, Orion
 1989–1995 HCS 1.0L, 1.1 L, 1.3 L (used in Fiesta Mk.3, Orion Mk.2/Escort Mk3-6)
 1995–2002 Endura-E 1.3 L OHV (UK: Fiesta Mk.4, Ka)
 1970s OHC/Pinto/T-88 Series
 1970–1989 EAO—1.3 L–2.0 L Cortina Mk.3-Mk.5, Sierra, Capri Mk.2&3, Granada Mk.2&3, Scorpio, Transit
 1974–1990s OHC—2.3 L (used in the Pinto, Mustang, the Merkur XR4Ti, 1975-79 Brazilian Maverick and Thunderbird Turbo Coupe)
 1983– OHC—2.0 L 2.3 L and the 2.5 L for the Ranger
 1989– I4 DOHC (used in Sierra, Scorpio/Granada Mk.3, Transit)
 1972–2000 York (Diesel) 2.3L, 2.4L, 2.5L (Used in Transit, A-Series (4 and 6-cyl version), London Taxi, also Ford-Iveco trucks, "DI" (Direct-Injection) version from 1984-on)
 1980–2002 CVH—1.1 L/1.3 L/1.4 L/1.6 L/1.8 L/1.9/2.0 L Escort (International), Escort (North America), Orion, Fiesta Mk.2, Sierra (Europe, Sierra from '89 onwards, 1.9L and 2.0L for USA only)
 1983–1995 CHT—(Brazil)
 1984–1994 HSC—2.3 L/2.5 L for Tempo and Taurus
 1983–1996 LT—(Diesel) 1.6 L/1.8 L/ 1.8 L turbodiesel. Used in Escort, Orion, Fiesta
 1986–2000 Lynx—(Diesel) 1.8 L/ 1.8 L turbodiesel. Used in Escort, Orion, Fiesta, Mondeo. Later branded as Endura-DE and developed to Duratorq DLD-418.
 1990s Mazda F—Mazda-engine 2.2 L for Probe
 1992–2004 Zeta/Zetec/Zetec-E (Used in Escort ZX2 (North America), Escort Mk.5 / Orion, Fiesta Mk.4, Ford Fiesta Mk.3/3.5, Mondeo Mk.1, Focus) (Ford Aspire/Kia)
 1995– Zetec-SE (Sigma) (Used in Fiesta Mk.4, Puma, Focus)
 2000– Duratorq—Diesel (Europe: Used in Mondeo Mk.3, Focus, Transit, Transit Connect, London Taxi TX1 (from 2002 onwards))
 2000– Duratec 8v/HE/20/23—(Duratec branded Mazda-engine used in Mondeo Mk.3, Focus Mk.2)
 2000–present Power Stroke 3.0—3.0 L Diesel (Brazil), Used in Ford Ranger (Argentina)
 2009–present EcoBoost—1.6 L/2.0 L Ford Sigma 1.6L and L 2.0L-engine with Direct Injection Spark Ignition
 2013–present EcoBoost—1.5 L
 2016–present EcoBlue—Diesel

5 cylinder
 2015–present; The 3.2 is an I5 engine used in the Ford Transit, the Ford Ranger, Ford Everest, Mazda BT-50 and the Vivarail. For the North American-spec Transit, * the 3.2L Duratorq is modified to meet American and Canadian emissions standards and is branded as a Power Stroke engine. The 3.2 Power Stroke is rated 188 PS (138 kW; 185 hp) and 470 N⋅m (350 lb⋅ft).[8]
2004-2011;The 2.5 Duratec is an inline 5 engine used in the Ford Focus ST225,Kuga,S-Max ST and various Volvo T5 models.It features DOHC, 20 valves and Ti-VCT.It displaces 2521cc and produces 166 kW (225hp) and 320 N.m (236lb.ft) in the ST or 227 kW (305hp) and 440 N.m (324.5lb.ft) in the Focus RS, or even up to 257kW (345hp) and 460 N.m (339lb.ft) in the RS500

6 cylinder
Ford was late to offer a six-cylinder engine in their cars, only introducing a six in 1941 after the failure of the 1906 Model K. The company relied on its famous Flathead V8 for most models, only seriously producing six-cylinder engines in the 1960s. The company was also late with a V6 engine, introducing a compact British V6 in 1967 but waiting until the 1980s to move their products to rely on V6 engines. The company has relied on seven major V6 families ever since, the Cologne/Taunus V6, British Essex V6, Canadian Essex V6, Vulcan V6, Mondeo V6, Cyclone V6, and Nano V6. The first five of these lines are no longer in production, leaving only the Cyclone and Nano as the company's midrange engines.
 1906–1907 Model K straight-6
 1941–2016 Straight-6
 1941–1951 226 CID Flathead
 1948–1953 254 CID Flathead used in buses and two ton trucks
 1952–1964 OHV (215, 223, 262) 215-223 used in car and non-HD pickups. 262 used in HD trucks only.

 1960–1993 (Longer in Australia) 'Falcon Six' OHV (144, 170, 200, 250) car usage.
 1964–1996 OHV (240, 300, 4.9 L) truck 6 built in Cleveland, Ohio
 1988–2002 Ford Australia SOHC I6 Falcon engines
 1988–1989 3.2 L SOHC
 1988–1992 3.9 L SOHC
 1992–2002 4.0 L SOHC
 1998–2002 4.0 L SOHC VCT
 2002–2016 Ford Australia Barra DOHC I6 4.0 L engines
 1951–1966 Zephyr 6—(United Kingdom)
 1964–2011 Cologne/Taunus V6—1.8–4.0 L pushrod and SOHC V6
 1966–1988 (2000 in South Africa) British Essex V6—60° British V6 2.5/3.0/3.1/3.4 L
 1982–2008 Canadian Essex V6—90° V6, 3.8/3.9/4.2 L models
 1986–1987 Ford-Cosworth GBA engine—120° V6, 1.5 L (Formula One engine)
 1986–2007 Vulcan V6—60° pushrod V6 3.0 L, originally designed for the Taurus
 1989–1995 SHO V6 3.0/3.2 L DOHC V6
 1994–2012 Mondeo V6 aluminum 60° DOHC
 1994–2002 Duratec 25—2.5 L
 1996–2012 Duratec 30—3.0 L
 2000–2011 Jaguar AJ-V6—2.1/2.5/3.0 L
 2003–present Ecotorq—7.3/9.0/12.7 L Diesel
 2004–present AJD-V6—2.7 L Diesel
 2006–2016 SI6—3.0/3.2 L I6 designed by Volvo
 2006–present Cyclone V6 aluminum 60° DOHC
 2018 Duratec 33—3.3 L
 2006–present Duratec 35—3.5 L
 2007–present Duratec 37—3.7 L
2009–present EcoBoost V6 engine
 2015–present EcoBoost—2.7 L
 2016–present EcoBoost—3.0 L
 2009–present EcoBoost—3.5 L

8 cylinder

Ford introduced the Flathead V8 in their affordable 1932 Model 18, becoming a performance leader for decades. In the 1950s, Ford introduced a three-tier approach to engines, with small, mid-sized, and larger engines aimed at different markets. All of Ford's mainstream V8 engines were replaced by the overhead cam Modular family in the 1990s and the company introduced a new large architecture, the Boss family, for 2010.
 1920–1932 Lincoln 60 Degree Fork & Blade V8—()
The Fork and Blade V8 used a novel approach for the piston connecting rods, which meant two connecting rods shared one bearing on the crankshaft, which allowed for a short crankshaft and a smaller overall engine size.
 1932–1953 Flathead V8
 1940–1950 Ford GAA engine, exclusively for armored fighting vehicle military use 
 1952–1963 Lincoln Y-block V8 engine—big-block (317/341/368), HD truck (279/302/317/332)
 1954–1964 Y-block V8—small-block Ford/Mercury/Edsel (239/256/272/292/312)
 1958–1968 MEL V8—big-block Mercury/Edsel/Lincoln (383/410/430/462)
 1958–1976 FE V8—medium-block Ford/Edsel
 1958–1971 Generation I (332/352/360/361/390)
 1962–1973 Generation II (406/410/427/428)
 1965–1968 Ford 427 side oiler
 FT truck (330/359/361/389/391)
 427 SOHC**
 1958–1981 Super Duty truck engine—big-block (401/477/534)
 1962–2000 Windsor—small-block (221/255/260/289/289HP/302/351W/Boss 302/427 aluminum)
 1963–1971 Ford Indy V8 engine (U.S.A.C. IndyCar engine)
 1968–1997 385 V8—big-block (370/429/Boss 429/460/514)
 1975–2007 Ford-Cosworth Indy V8 engine (U.S.A.C. IndyCar engine)
 1970–1982 335/Cleveland V8— small-block (351 Cleveland/400/351M/Boss 351)
 1969–1982 Ford Australia produced Cleveland V8 engines 302/351 (Geelong plant)
 1983–2010 Ford/Navistar Diesel V8
 1983–1987—6.9 L IDI (indirect injection)
 1988–1993—7.3 L IDI
 1993–1994.5—7.3 L IDI with Turbo
 1994.5–2003.5—7.3 L DI (direct injection) "Power Stroke"
 2003.5–2009—6.0 L DI "Power Stroke" (E and F-series vehicles)
 2008–2010—6.4 L DI "Power Stroke" (F-series only)
 1989–1993 Ford-Cosworth HB engine—DOHC 3.5 L (Formula One racing engine)
 1991–present Modular V8 —SOHC/DOHC 4.6/5.0/5.4/5.8 L
 1997–present Triton V8—truck versions of the Modular
 2003-2004 Terminator V8 DOHC Supercharged 4.6 L
 2010-2016 Ford Miami Coyote V8 based Ford Australia Ford Performance Vehicles 5.0L Supercharged DOHC VCT on intake cams only 
 2011–present Coyote V8 —DOHC TiVCT 5.0 L; In 2018 dual fuel injection added providing both port and direct injection.
2013–2014 Trinity V8 5.8 L, supercharged (Shelby GT500)
 2016–present Voodoo V8 —DOHC 5.2 L (Shelby GT350)
 2020–present Predator V8 —DOHC 5.2 L, supercharged (Shelby GT500)
 1994–1997 Ford-Cosworth EC / ED engine—DOHC 3.0/3.5 L (Formula One racing engine)
 1996–present Jaguar AJ-V8—small displacement DOHC V8 engine family also used by Lincoln LS and Ford Thunderbird
 1996–1999 SHO V8—3.4 L DOHC 60° V8 designed and produced with Yamaha Motor Corporation. This engine was only used in the Taurus SHO V-8.
 2005–2010 Volvo V8—4.4 L DOHC 60° V8 produced by Yamaha Motor Company in Japan in connection with Volvo Skövde Engine plant Sweden.
 Cosworth DFV—DOHC 3.0-liter Formula One racing engine
 2006–present AJD-V8—DOHC 3.6 L twin-turbo Diesel
 2010–present 4.4 Turbo Diesel V8—DOHC 4.4 L twin-turbo Diesel
 2010–present Boss V8—SOHC 6.2 L
 2011–present Scorpion Diesel V8—"Power Stroke" OHV 6.7 L 32-valve DI turbo diesel (F-series only)
2020–present Godzilla V8  — Pushrod V8 7.3L (445ci), gasoline, naturally aspirated, port fuel injected, variable timing, 16valve, 10.5:1 compression made for F-series Super Duty models.

10 cylinder
 1997–present Triton V10—6.8L SOHC 90° Modular V10 truck engine
 1999–2005 Ford-Cosworth JD / VJ engine (Formula One engine)
 1999–2005 Ford-Cosworth CR engine (Formula One engine)
 2001 5.8L DOHC 90° Modular V10, 4 valves/cyl. (Experimental). Ford Powertrain Division.

12 cylinder
 1932–1942 Lincoln L-head V12 (382/414/448)
 1936–1948 Lincoln-Zephyr V12 (267/292/306)
 1941 Ford V-12 aero engine 1941 Ford GAC V12 1995 Ford GT90 engine (used in the Ford GT90 concept car.)
 1999 - Current Aston Martin 6.0L V12''' (Originally made by Aston Martin under Ford ownership, continued by Aston Martin to present day.)

See also
 List of Ford vehicles
 List of Ford platforms
 List of Ford bellhousing patterns

References

External links
 Website & Forums dedicated to the Ford Windsor Engine
 Specs on Ford overhead valve V8 engines

 
Engines
Ford